New Erections is the third and final studio album by American punk rock band the Locust. It was released on March 20, 2007, via ANTI-, their second album for the label. The cover art is by Neil Burke.

Track listing

Personnel
The Locust
Justin Pearson – bass guitar, vocals
Bobby Bray – guitar, vocals
Joey Karam – keyboards, vocals
Gabe Serbian – drums, percussion, guitar
Wesley Eisold – backing vocals on 4

Production
Alex Newport – production, engineering, mixing
Gene Grimaldi – mastering

References

2007 albums
The Locust albums
Anti- (record label) albums
Albums produced by Alex Newport